Inverarity is a village in Angus, Scotland, UK, on the A90, 6 miles from Forfar, and 7 miles from Dundee. The nearest villages are Gateside, Invereighty, Kincaldrum and Gallowfauld. Inverarity used to be in the old county of Forfarshire. Its name means "creek of Arity".

Inverarity's first parish church dates from 1243; a replacement was built in 1754.

See also
List of places in Angus

References

Villages in Angus, Scotland